This is the discography of Beanie Sigel, an American rapper.

Albums

Studio albums

Collaborative album

Mixtapes
Public Enemy Number 1 (2004)
Still Public Enemy Number 1 (2006)
The Bully Is Back (2009)
The Bully Is Back 2 (2009)
The Official Beanie Sigel Mixtape (2009)

Singles

As lead artist

As featured artist

Promotional singles

Other charted songs

Guest appearances

Notes

References

External links
 
 
 

Hip hop discographies
Discographies of American artists